Loch Lomond (Scottish Gaelic: Loch Laomainn) is a community located in Richmond County, Nova Scotia, Canada.  It is named after Loch Lomond in Dunbartonshire, Scotland.

The community sits upon the eastern shore of a lake which is also named Loch Lomond. It is known for its scenery and its wide appeal for summer cottages. It also has a rich history kept alive by the community. Loch Lomond is a fresh water lake that is used for fishing and boating.

Many of the early settlers were pioneers who settled the area in 1828, from the islands of Harris and Uist Scotland. There is a monument by the side of the road commemorating them.

Some of settlers moved to St. Anns, near Baddeck.

References
Loch Lomond on Destination Nova Scotia

General Service Areas in Nova Scotia
Communities in Richmond County, Nova Scotia